The 1960 Calgary Stampeders finished in 3rd place in the W.I.F.U. with a 6–8–2 record. They were defeated in the West Semi-Finals by the Edmonton Eskimos.

This was the first season at McMahon Stadium for the Stamps.

Regular season

Season standings

1960 season schedule

1960 preseason

1960 regular season

1960 playoffs
Western Conference Semi-Finals
(two-game, total points series)

Calgary lost the series 70–28.  Edmonton advanced to play the Winnipeg Blue Bombers in the Western Conference Finals.

Awards and records
Tony Pajaczkowski, runner-up to Ron Stewart of the Ottawa Rough Riders for the CFL Outstanding Canadian Schenley Award.

References

Calgary Stampeders seasons
1960 Canadian Football League season by team